The Justice and Development Party is a political party in Morocco that advocates for political Islam. It was the ruling party of Morocco from 2011 to 2021.

History
PJD was founded by Abdelkrim al-Khatib, one of the founders of the Popular Movement party, from which he was expelled in the mid-1960s, under the name of MPDC (the "Popular Democratic and Constitutional Movement"). The party was an empty shell for many years, until various members of a clandestine association Chabiba Islamia, who later formed the MUR (the "Unity and Reform Movement") joined the party, with the authorisation and encouragement of former interior minister Driss Basri. It later changed its name to current PJD in 1998.

The party won eight seats in the parliamentary election in 1997. In the parliamentary election held on 27 September 2002, the party won 42 out of 325 seats, winning most of the districts where it fielded candidates. Its secretary-general since 2004 was Saadeddine Othmani, MP representing Mohammedia. In the parliamentary election held on 7 September 2007, the PJD won 43 out of 325 seats, behind the Istiqlal Party, which won 52. This was contrary to expectations that the PJD would win the most seats. However, the party had limited number of candidates in the election.

Abdelilah Benkirane was elected leader of the PJD in July 2008, taking over from Saadeddine Othmani. Having won a plurality of seats (107 seats) in the November 2011 parliamentary election, the party formed a coalition with three parties that had been part of previous governments, and Benkirane was appointed Prime Minister of Morocco on 29 November 2011.

His new government has targeted average economic growth of 5.5 percent a year during its four-year mandate, and to reduce the jobless rate to 8 percent by the end of 2016 from 9.1 percent at the start of 2012. Benkirane's government has also actively pursued Morocco’s ties with the European Union, its chief trade partner, as well as becoming increasingly engaged with the six-member Gulf Co-operation Council.

In the 2021 general election, the PJD suffered a crushing defeat, losing 113 seats.

On 11 March 2023, PJD criticized Nasser Bourita, Morocco’s foreign minister, claiming that he defended Israel during meetings with African and European officials. PJD Leader, Abdelilah Benkirane asked members of the party to not comment on the statement released by the Royal Cabinet regarding the Palestine cause. Later claiming that the comments were aimed towards foreign minister, Nasser Bourita, and not the nation’s interests.

Ideology
PJD is a conservative Islamic-democratic party which supports the Moroccan monarchy. PJD disavows violence, terrorism and seeks to defend Morocco’s Islamic identity through legislative means.

According to a paper published by the Carnegie Endowment for International Peace, the PJD has placed economic and legal issues at the core of its platform and is committed to internal democracy.

The party's stated platform includes:
 Education reform and reestablishment.
 Economic partnerships with other countries.
 Enhancement of democracy and human rights.
 Encouraging investment.
 Greater "Arab and Muslim unity".

Electoral results

Moroccan Parliament

Notes

References

External links
Justice and Development Party 
Attajdid newspaper 

1998 establishments in Morocco
Conservative parties in Africa
Islamic democratic political parties
Islamism in Morocco
Moroccan nationalism
Nationalist parties in Africa
Political parties established in 1998
Political parties in Morocco
Social conservative parties